Barton may refer to:

Places

Australia
 Barton, Australian Capital Territory, a suburb of Canberra
 Division of Barton, an electoral district in New South Wales
 Barton, Victoria, a locality near Moyston

Canada
 Barton, Newfoundland and Labrador, community
 Barton, Nova Scotia, a community
 Barton Mine, an abandoned mine in Temagami, Ontario
 Barton Street (Hamilton, Ontario)

England
 Barton, Cambridgeshire, a village and civil parish
 Barton, Cheshire, a village and parish
 Barton, Cumbria, a hamlet and civil parish
 Barton, Gloucestershire, a village
 Barton, Isle of Wight
 Barton, Preston, a linear village and parish in Lancashire 
 Barton, North Yorkshire, a village and parish
 Barton, Oxfordshire, a suburb of Oxford
 Barton, Warwickshire, a village
 Barton, West Lancashire, a village
 Barton Broad, a Broad and nature reserve in Norfolk
 Barton-upon-Humber, a town in Lincolnshire
 Barton upon Irwell, Greater Manchester

Scotland
 Dumbarton, West Dunbartonshire, a town

United States
 Barton, Alabama, an unincorporated community
 Barton, Arkansas, an unincorporated community
 Barton, California, an unincorporated community
 Barton Flats, California, an area of the San Bernardino National Forest
 Barton, Maryland, a town
 Barton City, Michigan, an unincorporated community
 Barton, Nebraska, an unincorporated community
 Barton, New Mexico, a census-designated place
 Barton, New York, a town
 Barton, Ohio, an unincorporated community
 Barton, Oregon, an unincorporated community
 Barton, Vermont, a town
 Barton (village), Vermont, a village within the town
 Barton, Wisconsin, a town
 Barton Dam, Michigan
 Barton River, Vermont
 Barton Creek, Texas, a tributary of the Colorado River
 Barton Springs, Austin, Texas, four water springs
 Camp Barton, a Boy Scouts of America camp near Ithaca, New York
 Barton County, Kansas 
 Barton County, Missouri
 Barton Township (disambiguation)

Elsewhere
 Barton (crater), Venus
 Barton Peninsula, South Shetland Islands
 Barton Creek (Belize)

Businesses 
 Barton Organ Company, an American theater pipe organ manufacturer
 Barton Transport, a ceased Nottinghamshire (UK) bus operating company
 Barton Brands, makers of liquor

Schools 
 Barton College, a private liberal arts college in Wilson, North Carolina, United States
 Barton Community College, Great Bend, Kansas, United States
 Barton Academy, Mobile, Alabama, United States, a school building on the National Register of Historic Places
 Barton Academy (Vermont), a former high school in Barton, Vermont, United States

Ships 
 , a destroyer
 , a destroyer
 Barton (ship), three sailing ships

People and fictional characters 
 Barton (surname), a list of people
 Bartoň, Czech surname
 Barton (given name), a list of people and fictional characters

Other uses 
 Barton (demesne), historically synonymous with a feudal demesne in the English West Country, now typically meaning a large farmhouse or the manor house
 Barton (horse), a racehorse
 Barton Highway, in New South Wales and the Australian Capital Territory
 "Barton", a song by Lisa Hannigan from At Swim
 Barton, a code name for a generation of AMD Athlon XP processors
 Barton Town, a virtual town in Gaia Online
 Barton Coliseum, a multi-purpose arena in Little Rock, Arkansas, United States
 Barton Beds, a geological layer in southern England

See also
 Barton Hartshorn, Buckinghamshire
 Barton in Fabis, Nottinghamshire
 Barton in the Beans, Leicestershire
 Barton on Sea, Hampshire
 Barton St David, Somerset
 Barton-le-Clay, Bedfordshire, a large village and parish
 Barton-le-Street, North Yorkshire
 Barton-le-Willows, North Yorkshire
 Barton-under-Needwood, Staffordshire
 Barton-upon-Humber, Lincolnshire, a small town
 Barton-upon-Irwell, Greater Manchester, a suburban area
 Barton (Kettering BC Ward), Northamptonshire
 Barton Turf, Norfolk
 Barton Turn, Staffordshire